Peripherin-2 is a protein, that in humans is encoded by the PRPH2 gene. Peripherin-2 is found in the rod and cone cells of the retina of the eye. Defects in this protein result in one form of retinitis pigmentosa, an incurable blindness.

Mutations in the PRPH2 gene are associated with Vitelliform macular dystrophy.

Function 

The protein encoded by this gene is a member of the transmembrane 4 superfamily, also known as the tetraspanin family. Most of these members are cell-surface proteins that are characterized by the presence of four transmembrane helices. Tetraspanins mediate signal transduction events that play a role in the regulation of cell development, activation, growth and motility.

Peripherin 2 (sometimes referred to as peripherin/RDS or simply RDS) is a cell surface glycoprotein found in the outer segment of both rod and cone photoreceptor cells. It is located in the rim regions of the flattened disks that contain rhodopsin, which is the protein that is responsible for initiation of visual phototransduction upon reception of light. Peripherin 2 may function as an adhesion molecule involved in stabilization and compaction of outer segment disks or in the maintenance of the curvature of the rim. This protein is essential for disk morphogenesis.

Clinical significance 

Defects in this gene are associated with both central and peripheral retinal degenerations. Some of the various phenotypically different disorders are autosomal dominant retinitis pigmentosa, progressive macular degeneration, macular dystrophy and retinitis pigmentosa digenic.

References

External links
  GeneReviews/NIH/NCBI/UW entry on Retinitis Pigmentosa Overview

Further reading